Ella Harris (born 18 July 1998) is a New Zealand professional racing cyclist, who currently rides for UCI Women's WorldTeam .

Major results
Sources:
2016
 7th Time trial, Oceania Junior Road Championships
2019
 4th Overall Colorado Classic
 7th Gravel and Tar La Femme
 8th Overall Vuelta a Burgos Feminas
1st  Young rider classification
2020
 1st  Time trial, National Under-23 Road Championships
 4th Overall Women's Herald Sun Tour
1st  Mountains classification 
1st Stage 2
 7th Emakumeen Nafarroako Klasikoa
 9th Cadel Evans Great Ocean Road Race

References

External links

1998 births
Living people
New Zealand female cyclists
Place of birth missing (living people)
20th-century New Zealand women
21st-century New Zealand women